The Neihu Refuse Incineration Plant is an incinerator in Neihu District, Taipei, Taiwan.

History
The construction of the plant was completed in January 1992, led by Takuma Co. Ltd. as the main contractor.

Technical details
The plant can treat 900 tons of garbage per day and produce 144 MWh of electricity per day. As of 2020, it received a total of 4,855 tons of garbage annually and incinerated 410 tons of them.

See also
 Air pollution in Taiwan
 Waste management in Taiwan
Beitou Refuse Incineration Plant, also located in Taipei

References

External links
  

1992 establishments in Taiwan
Incinerators in Taipei
Infrastructure completed in 1992